Mehdi Eslami may refer to:
Mehdi Eslami (footballer, born 1985), Iranian goalkeeper for Machine Sazi
Mehdi Eslami (footballer, born 1992), Iranian defender for Esteghlal Ahvaz